New York State Route 878 (NY 878) is a state highway on Long Island and in New York City. The route exists in two sections, which both form the Nassau Expressway. NY 878's western terminus is the Belt Parkway and Conduit Avenue (NY 27) in Ozone Park, within southern Queens. Its southern terminus is immediately before the Village of Atlantic Beach, at the Atlantic Beach Bridge in Lawrence, within southwestern Nassau County. NY 878 is discontinuous between Farmers Boulevard in Queens and the town of Inwood in Nassau County. The two sections are connected to each other by Rockaway Boulevard and Rockaway Turnpike.

NY 878 is maintained in part by the New York City Department of Transportation (NYCDOT); the New York State Department of Transportation (NYSDOT); and the government of Nassau County. The NYSDOT also maintains part of Rockaway Boulevard, which is designated as the reference route NY 909G. The  of NY 878 between I-678 and the JFK Expressway is officially designated Interstate 878 (I-878), but not signed as such. This segment is instead signed as NY 878. The NYSDOT designated the eastbound lanes of the freeway as I-878 in January 1970, but the entire Nassau Expressway was publicly re-designated as NY 878 by 1991. The unsigned Interstate 878 is the shortest Interstate Highway in the United States.

NY 878, the Nassau Expressway, was originally planned in 1945 as a freeway between the Belt Parkway in Queens and Long Beach in Nassau. The expressway was supposed to replace Rockaway Boulevard and Turnpike in the vicinity of what is now JFK Airport, connecting to a proposed Long Beach Expressway south of Atlantic Beach Bridge. The short freeway portion in Queens was originally built as part of Interstate 78 (I-78) in the late 1960s, but the segment of I-78 through New York City was canceled in March 1971 due to community opposition. Through the 1970s, the rest of the freeway south of 150th Street was also canceled for various reasons. A scaled-down version of the road in Nassau County, a 4-lane arterial road, was completed in 1990. There has been an attempt to complete the section of the freeway in Queens, but it was deferred due to the early 1990s economic recession.

Route description

Northern segment

It lies along the north edge of JFK Airport, just south of the Belt Parkway and Conduit Avenue (NY 27). Officially NY 878 starts at the interchange between the Belt Parkway, Conduit Avenue (NY 27) and Cross Bay Boulevard, and it stretches east to the intersection of Rockaway and Farmers Boulevards. The eastbound freeway does begin in the median of Conduit Avenue just west of Cross Bay Boulevard, but it carries NY 27 until the highways split at a point between the IND Rockaway Line underpass and Lefferts Boulevard. The separate NY 878 begins at that split, but the route only carries eastbound one-way traffic until it reaches the junction with I-678 (Van Wyck Expressway). There it becomes a two-way freeway. NY 878 continues east past the JFK Expressway, and the freeway ends at a traffic light at North Hangar Road. NY 878 ends soon after at Rockaway Boulevard and Farmers Boulevard.

The  stretch from I-678 (Van Wyck Expressway) east to the JFK Expressway is designated but not signed as I-878 by the Federal Highway Administration. This makes I-878 the shortest three-digit Interstate Route and the shortest Interstate Highway in the Interstate Highway System. This section of NY 878 only has route designations for the eastbound lanes. The New York State Department of Transportation (NYSDOT) designates I-878 as the stretch of NY 878 from the Van Wyck Expressway east to the 150th Street underpass. The entire segment, including the unsigned I-878, is maintained by the NYSDOT.

Rockaway Boulevard in Queens, as well as Rockaway Turnpike in Nassau County, connect the two halves of NY 878. From the end of NY 878 to near Guy R. Brewer Boulevard, the road is maintained by the New York City Department of Transportation (NYCDOT). From Guy R. Brewer Boulevard to just before the city line, the road is designated as the unsigned state reference route NY 909G. The last  before the city border are city-maintained. The part of Rockaway Turnpike that connects to NY 878 is maintained by Nassau County.

Southern segment
Signage for NY 878 can be seen from the split with Rockaway Turnpike south to the toll plaza of the Atlantic Beach Bridge in Lawrence. However, the NYSDOT only considers a  piece of the highway to be part of NY 878. The state-maintained portion of NY 878 comprises the segment south of Burnside Avenue in Inwood. The segment from Rockaway Turnpike to Burnside Avenue is maintained by the highway. The southern section of NY 878 has no connections to other state routes.

History

Predecessors and planning 
The portion of Rockaway Boulevard and Turnpike between NY 27 and the Atlantic Beach Bridge was originally designated as New York State Route 104 by 1931. However, this designation was removed by 1932.

The expressway was first proposed in late 1945, to connect Brooklyn with southeastern Queens and the South Shore of Long Island, as well as to provide a link to Idlewild (now JFK) Airport. It was among several highways planned jointly between Robert Moses' Triborough Bridge and Tunnel Authority (TBTA), and the Port Authority of New York and New Jersey. By 1949, the Nassau Expressway was planned along with a replacement for the original Atlantic Beach Bridge. It was envisioned by Moses and Nassau County executive J. Russell Sprague as a vital link between Atlantic Beach, the Belt Parkway system, and the Bronx–Whitestone Bridge. A contract for preliminary engineering work was awarded that year. As originally proposed, the highway would have only extended from the interchange with Van Wyck Expressway and Belt Parkway to the Atlantic Beach Bridge.

In the beginning, the Nassau Expressway was supposed to be a single highway, with the now-separate spurs to be connected by a highway running parallel to Rockaway Boulevard and Rockaway Turnpike. The connector highway would have passed through the wetlands of Idlewild and Hook Creek, then turned south through the small community of Meadowmere, Queens, located near Five Towns. This route was favored as a replacement to Rockaway Boulevard/Turnpike, which was viewed as inadequate and congested. A map of the expressway was presented to the Nassau residents in 1951. Three years later, the state made the first land acquisitions for the Nassau segment of the expressway.

The Nassau Expressway was proposed alongside the never-built Long Beach Expressway. The Long Beach Expressway would have extended east past the Atlantic Beach Bridge along the South Shore to Long Beach and Lido Beach, ending at a junction with the Loop Parkway leading to Jones Beach and the Meadowbrook State Parkway. The Long Beach Expressway would have been a six-lane expressway, running along Reynolds Channel on the north shore of the Long Beach Barrier Island to New York Avenue, then along Park Avenue, which was the primary commercial thoroughfare of Long Beach.

The Nassau Expressway was mapped as part of the Interstate Highway System in 1961. At that point, the New York State Department of Public Works began purchasing land for both the Nassau and Long Beach Expressways. Over  of land were ceded from Idlewild Park near JFK Airport for the construction of the expressway. The small community of Meyers Harbor, located in the Hook Creek wetlands east of the modern Five Towns Shopping Center, was condemned and destroyed to provide a path for the expressway. Many homes in Inwood were either condemned and demolished or relocated in order to facilitate the expressway. However, Long Beach residents opposed the proposed expressway's routing along Park Avenue, as the residents believed the highway would create a "Chinese Wall" dividing their community. The Long Beach Expressway was vetoed by the state in 1967 due to community opposition.

Construction and delays 
The first section of the Nassau Expressway to be built was a  eastbound-only segment between Cross Bay Boulevard and 150th Street. The eastbound lanes ended at a point near JFK Expressway. The Nassau Expressway intersected with the Van Wyck Expressway at JFK Airport. The construction of this section was approved by the New York City Planning Commission and New York City Board of Estimate in 1963, and work began in 1965. The new roadway was completed in either 1967 or 1971. The construction of the highway's eastbound lanes drastically reduced congestion and increased average traffic speeds for drivers traveling eastbound on South Conduit Avenue and the Nassau Expressway. Westbound drivers on North Conduit Avenue continued to experience  congestion since no new highway lanes had been built for these drivers. This corridor saw an average of 600,000 daily trips by 1981, of which 20% were made by airport travelers.

Construction along Rockaway Boulevard and in Nassau County was hindered due to the presence of muck, which was located in the wetlands near the Queens-Nassau border. The muck could not be built upon, and removing it would be both expensive and environmentally risky. The wetlands had previously been used as a garbage landfill by the New York City Department of Sanitation. In addition, residents opposed this segment of the highway. As with the canceled Long Beach Expressway it would have created a "Chinese wall" between communities in Nassau County.

In March 1971, Governor Nelson Rockefeller revealed a plan for improving New York City highways. The plan denied funding to several proposed New York City Interstate Highways, including the Nassau Expressway segment east of 150th Street to Rockaway Boulevard. Rockefeller said that these highways did not qualify for a funding agreement from the Federal-Aid Highway Act of 1952, in which the federal government would pay 90% of the proposed highway's cost. The New York Times quoted a state official who said that this move had the effect of canceling these projects.  By that time, less than a quarter of the proposed $51.8 million,  highway had been completed. The only section open at the time, the eastbound freeway west of JFK Airport, had been built at a cost of $18 million. Maps from the 1970s show that the connector between the Van Wyck and Rockaway Boulevard had yet to be constructed. However, a 1971 New York Times article mentioned that the freeway between the Van Wyck Expressway and 150th Street was already open.  At the time, the entire highway from Queens to Nassau was planned for completion in 1981.

By around late 1973, work on the project restarted. Builders sought funds from the Federal-Aid Highway Act of 1973 to pay for construction. At that time, plans called for the completion of the highway's westbound lanes west of 150th Street, as well as the sections of the freeway along Rockaway Boulevard and in Nassau County. Rockaway Boulevard would have also been relocated and modernized. However, the federal government refused to approve the funding, and the money was instead distributed among projects in Arkansas; Indiana; and Fort Worth, Texas. This further delayed the construction of the Nassau Expressway. By then, the unbuilt segment in Nassau was called the "phantom expressway" because it had been in the planning stages for decades. The right-of-way for the unbuilt expressway became an unused, rodent-infested "wasteland". Meanwhile, Rockaway Turnpike was carrying five times the number of cars it had been built to accommodate.

In 1976, New York Governor Hugh Carey announced the publication of the New York State Department of Transportation (NYSDOT)'s five-year, $212 million highway improvement plan. This proposal included completing much of the rest of the Nassau Expressway. Three years later, the NYSDOT published plans for the segment of the expressway that would be built in Nassau. A revised plan for the Nassau County section of the highway was introduced around 1981. It called for a four-lane arterial highway between Rockaway Turnpike and the Atlantic Beach Bridge. This section was opened in March 1990.

Also around 1980, plans to complete the westbound lanes of the expressway in Queens were reintroduced. The new expressway would include direct access to Aqueduct Racetrack. Work on the expressway project was to begin in 1998. However, by the 1990s, the project had not commenced, even though the new expressway would have relieved congestion on the parallel Belt Parkway. Construction was delayed indefinitely in 1995 due to a lack of funds due to the early-1990s recession, as well as a general decline in horse racing at the Aqueduct Racetrack, which obviated the need for the westbound freeway in Queens.

In 1998, Nassau County legislator Bruce A. Blakeman proposed renaming the southern portion of NY 878 after President Ronald Reagan. Originally, he wanted that name applied to the Seaford–Oyster Bay Expressway (NY 135) further east. After opposition to that expressway's renaming, Blakeman then proposed renaming the Nassau Expressway after Reagan. However, the Nassau Expressway renaming proposal was also opposed.

In October 2014, Nassau County Legislator Howard Kopel (representing Lawrence) and New York State Assemblyman Phil Goldfeder (representing Howard Beach, Broad Channel, and the Rockaways) advocated for the completion of the entire Nassau Expressway, in order to alleviate traffic on Rockaway Boulevard and Rockaway Turnpike, and to provide an evacuation route in the event of a natural disaster.

Designation history

From circa 1959 until 1970, the I-878 designation was used for a section of what is now I-278 (Bruckner Expressway) between Sheridan Boulevard (formerly the Sheridan Expressway) and the Cross Bronx Expressway (I-95) in the Bronx. I-278 was routed north on the Sheridan, while its present route was taken by I-878. At that time, the northwest piece of present NY 878 was to be part of I-78, which would have continued from the Holland Tunnel along the Lower Manhattan Expressway, Williamsburg Bridge and Bushwick Expressway to reach the Nassau Expressway at Cross Bay Boulevard. Northeast of Kennedy Airport, I-78 was to turn north onto the Clearview Expressway, using the Throgs Neck Bridge and Cross Bronx Expressway to end at the Bruckner Interchange.

The one-way eastbound section of the Nassau Expressway from Cross Bay Boulevard to the Van Wyck Expressway was built in 1967, when the highway was still part of I-78. I-78 through New York City was canceled in March 1971. Effective January 1, 1970, the year before, the Nassau Expressway and unbuilt Cross Brooklyn Expressway, stretching from I-278 at the Verrazano-Narrows Bridge east to the Atlantic Beach Bridge, was officially designated I-878 by the NYSDOT. The Nassau Expressway was redesignated as NY 878 by 1991.

Until 2005, the southern terminus of the southern portion of NY 878 was at Meadow Causeway. In 2005, NY 878 was extended south to its present terminus at the Atlantic Beach Bridge toll barrier, resulting in an overlap with NY 900V. The NY 900V designation, now redundant to NY 878, was removed by October 2007.

Major intersections
Exit numbers on NY 878's northern segment are only posted in the eastbound direction. There are no exit numbers for the westbound lanes.

References

External links

 NY 878 (Greater New York Roads)

Interstate 78
878
Roads_on_Long_Island
Transportation in Nassau County, New York
Expressways in New York City
878
Transportation in Queens, New York
Unfinished buildings and structures in the United States